The Royal University of Ireland was founded in accordance with the University Education (Ireland) Act 1879 as an examining and degree-awarding university based on the model of the University of London. A Royal Charter was issued on 27 April 1880 and examinations were open to candidates irrespective of attendance at college lectures. The first chancellor was the Irish chemist Robert Kane.

The university became the first university in Ireland that could grant degrees to women on a par with those granted to men. The first nine women students graduated in 1884. It granted its first degree to a woman on 22 October 1884 to Charlotte M. Taylor (Bachelor of Music). In 1888 Letitia Alice Walkington had the distinction of becoming the first woman in Great Britain or Ireland to receive a degree of Bachelor of Laws. Among the honorary degree recipients of the university was Douglas Hyde, founder of the Gaelic League and later President of Ireland, who was awarded a DLitt in 1906.

Establishment
The Royal University of Ireland was the successor to the Queen's University of Ireland, dissolved in 1882, and the graduates, professors, students and colleges of that predecessor were transferred to the new university. In addition to the Queen's Colleges, Magee College, University College, Dublin, Cecillia St. Medical School, St. Patrick's College, Maynooth and Blackrock College presented students for examinations as well, and no special status was accorded to the colleges of the former Queen's University. After the 1880 reforms Catholic Colleges such as Carlow College, Holy Cross College and Blackrock College ("The French College") came under the Catholic University, and with a number of other seminaries presented students for examination by the RUI.

External students at colleges that were not approved could sit examinations of the Royal University (and many did so) although they were considered at a disadvantage to those from designated colleges whose professors were part of the university.

In fact, many schools, including convent schools (such as Dominican College, Eccles St, Dublin; Alexandra College, Dublin; Loreto College, St Stephen's Green, Dublin; Methodist College, Belfast; High School for Girls, Derry; St Columb's College, Derry; Mungret College, Limerick; Rutland School, Mountjoy Square, Dublin; Dominican College, Sion Hill, Dublin; St. Angela's College, Cork; St Louis's, Monaghan; Presentation College, Cork; Christian Brothers College, Cork; Rochelle College, Cork) prepared students for the examinations (including degree examinations) of the Royal University.

Like the Queen's University, the Royal University was entitled to grant any degree, similar to that of any other university in the United Kingdom of Great Britain and Ireland, except in theology. The colleges themselves would award degrees in theology and divinity.

The professorships and Senate of the Royal University were shared equally between Roman Catholics and Protestants. However, colleges of the university maintained full independence except in the awarding of degrees, and the compilation and enforcement of academic regulations and standards.

The members of the Senate of the Royal University included Gerald Molloy, William Joseph Walsh, John Healy, the Marquess of Dufferin and Ava, George Arthur Hastings Forbes, 7th Earl of Granard, Anthony Nugent, 11th Earl of Westmeath, Daniel Mannix and George Johnston Allman.

Chancellors
 Robert Kane, Chemist, appointed 1880
 William Monsell, 1st Baron Emly (1885–1894 )
 Reginald Brabazon, 12th Earl of Meath (1902–1906)
 Bernard FitzPatrick, 2nd Baron Castletown (1906–1910)

Fellows
Thomas Preston, scientist
William P Coyne, Economist
Gerard Manley Hopkins, poet

Notable graduates
A high number of graduates of the university for the time were women (the first nine in 1884) because Trinity College Dublin did not accept female students until 1904.

Thomas Joseph Campbell - BA (1892), LL.B (1894), MA(1897), BL.
Arthur W. Conway – BA (1896) – President of University College Dublin (1940–1947).
Éamon de Valera – Mathematics (1904), Taoiseach and President of Ireland
Alexander Ernest Donnelly
William Egan –  M.B. Bch. B.A.O. Royal Army Medical Corp. World War I – Major DSO OBE
Eleanora Fleury – MB MD, first woman medical graduate in 1893 later working as psychiatrist
Mary Hayden – BA in 1885, and MA in Modern Languages in 1887
John Hooper (Irish statistician) – BA (1898) –  first Director of the Statistics Branch of the Department of Industry and Commerce in Ireland
Douglas Hyde  – Honorary Degree
James Joyce BA Modern Languages (1902)
Kathleen Lynn – Medicine (1899)
Eoin MacNeill - Irish scholar and Sinn Féin politician
Isabella Mulvany BA (1884) – Principal of Alexandra College.
Kathleen O'Callaghan – A founder member of Cumann na mBan, and Sinn Féin TD.
Agnes O'Farrelly BA (1899), MA (1900) – Professor of modern Irish in UCD (1932–1947)
James O'Mara BA (1898) – Irish Parliamentary Party MP, and Sinn Féin MP for Kilkenny South.
Alice Oldham BA, campaigned for women to be admitted to Trinity College Dublin.
Pádraig Pearse – BA Modern Languages (1901)
Thomas Preston, scientist and discoverer the Anomalous Zeeman Effect, among other achievements
Hanna Sheehy-Skeffington – BA (1899), MA (1902)
Letitia Alice Walkington – BA (1885), MA (1886), LLB (1888), LLD (1889)
Cardinal D'Alton – Archbishop of Armagh and Primate of All Ireland 1946–1963

Dissolution

On 31 October 1909 the Royal University was dissolved; the National University of Ireland and Queen's University Belfast took over its functions under the Irish Universities Act 1908, which provided for the transfer of graduates, staff and students to one or the other of these new universities. The final degree congregation of the Royal University of Ireland in 1909 involving 350 students was accompanied by demonstrations in favour of the Irish language being compulsory for the new National University.

Arms

See also
List of split up universities

References

External links
 Education,Higher - Ireland/Royal University of Ireland index of official documents digitised by Enhanced British Parliamentary Papers On Ireland

1909 disestablishments in Europe
1882 establishments in Ireland
Defunct universities and colleges in Ireland
Educational institutions disestablished in 1909
Educational institutions established in 1882
University of Galway